Prakash Bare is an Indian theater and film actor focusing on Malayalam, English and other south Indian language productions. Starting with the 2010 Malayalam film Sufi Paranja Katha, Prakash has acted in more than 30 films directed by some of the most eminent filmmakers. He is now a live presence in south Indian art house movies and theater scene. Prakash is also a technologist and entrepreneur focusing on VLSI, Software, media production etc. As a social activist, Prakash is involved in the Endosulfan struggle of Kasaragod and is the president of CERV Collectives which secured interim compensation of 5Lakhs for 6000 plus affected patients through a legal campaign

Early life 

Prakash grew up in Chirakkal, a small village in Kannur district and attended Kamala Nehru UP School, Govt Model High School, Valapattanam and S. N. College, Kannur for Pre University Degree. He completed B.Tech in Electrical Engineering from NSS College of Engineering, Palakkad, Kerala. Prakash was active in dramatics during the college days and has won many accolades including Best Actor awards in Calicut University Interzone arts festival. He later did a masters in Microelectronics from IIT Kanpur, and spent 15 years in Silicon Valley, California where he worked as a technologist and entrepreneur in the micro chip design and automation industry.

Tech career 

Prakash has held various technology and business positions in electronics design industry in the US and India. He was a co-founder of GDA Technologies Inc, one of the pioneering Electronic Design Services(EDS) companies. GDA, listed as one of the fastest-growing privately held companies in US by Inc Magazine its annual INC500 list in 2002, was subsequently acquired by Rambus Inc and L&T Technology Services in March 2007. He is currently the Co-founder of Sinergia Media Labs, based in Smartcity Kochi which is into digital transformation services.

Acting career 

Prakash Bare has acted in more than 30 films, mostly critically acclaimed and artistic, in Malayalam, Kannada, Marathi and English languages directed by eminent filmmakers like Priyanandanan, P. Balachandran, Dr. Biju, Sanal Kumar Sasidharan, Shyamaprasad, Jayan K. Cherian, Sathyan Anthikkad, V. K. Prakash, Abi Varghese, M. Padmakumar, Lijin Jose, Sajeevan Anthikkad, Satheesh Paul, MG Sasi, Shalini Usha Nair et al. Ivan Megharoopan, Oraalppokkam, Sufi Paranja Katha, Shutter(Marathi), Oru Indian Pranayakatha and Kaadu Pookkunna Neram are some of most noticed performances of Prakash.

Prakash is best known for his depiction of poet KP Madhavan Nair in Ivan Megharoopan inspired by the life and works of the renowned Malayalam poet P. Kunhiraman Nair (popularly known as Mahakavi P). Poets O.N.V. Kurup and Kavalam Narayana Panicker, contemporaries of the great poet, observed that Prakash performed brilliantly as P, even with exact the body language as if he is very familiar with P though he has never met him in person. Renowned filmmaker Sathyan Anthikkad also highly appreciated Prakash's performance as the poet and invited him for his next film Oru Indian Pranayakatha to do the much noticed role of Azad, an Ittharwala from Rajastan. Prakash's performance was also lauded by the John Abraham award jury in their citation for that year's award for the film. Critic Veeyen in his review commented: "The film belongs to Prakash Bare, and his luminescent performance that puts in the right amounts of mirth, gloom and life itself, helps him capture the poet that he plays with aplomb and move far beyond a mere impersonation".

Another noted performance of Prakash is in film Oraalppokkam, produced by Kazhcha Chalachithra Vedi through online crowdfunding  and shot in Kedarnath and Uttarakhand areas. The Hollywood Reporter observed that "playing the uncommitted philosophy teacher forced to question his very existence, Prakash creates an anxious, self-deceiving but always believable hero". Paresh Palicha in his review in Rediff.com observes: "It is Prakash Bare as an actor who shoulders the responsibility of communicating the director’s vision to the viewer and he does it with utmost sincerity. We can see the turmoil he is going through in the entire film."

Diverse roles like Maamootty in Sufi Paranja Katha, Filmmaker in Shutter(Marathi), Itthar trader Azad in Oru Indian Pranayakatha, IT tycoon Mahesh Moorthy in Ivide, Sub Inspector in Kaadu Pookkunna Neram, Dr Mohankumar in Valiya Chirakulla Pakshikal, Thahasildar Sunil Das in Jalam, Swami Haripanchanana Baba in Prabhuvinte Makkal are some of the other most noted performances of Prakash. The investigation officer DIG Balagopal Narayan in Satheesh Paul's Kaattu Vithachavar and the filmmaker in Dr. Biju's new English film Painting Life are Prakash's upcoming lead roles.

Production activities 
Under the banner Silicon Media, Prakash has produced/co-produced Sufi Paranja Katha, Janaki, Ivan Megharoopan, Shutter(Marathi), and Papilio Buddha. Thampi Antony has been a co-producer for the first four productions of Silicon Media and Gopa Periyadan a collaborator on Ivan Megharoopan. Their productions have won several recognitions including 15 state film awards and official selections to reputed film festivals like Berlin, Montreal, BFI, Durban, Kerala, Mumbai, Kolkata, Trinidad-Tobago etc.

Prakash has tried to experiment with his productions by staying away from formulas and conventions His focus areas include content creation and delivery on internet and the newer technology trends in that domain. Prakash has also been part of multiple crowd funded films as an actor as well as collaborator. Teaming up with MP Sajeev and VKP, he produced Shutter in Marathi language (2015). In 2016, he co-produced a sitcom Brown Nation, based on the lives of Indian community living in NJ area, which is well received on Netflix. Dr. Biju's English film Painting Life is Silicon Media's upcoming production.

Theater 

Prakash formed BlueOcean Theater group along with friends and colleagues including Jayaprakash Kulur, VKP, Padmapriya, Manojkumar Narayanan, musician Sunilkumar et al.

BlueOcean theater productions includes plays based on the works of Samuel Beckett, Anton Chekhov, Neil Simon, Jayaprakash Kulur and NN Pillai. Becket's Waiting for Godot was presented in Malayalam as "Godoye Kaathu" (based on Kadammanitta's translation), directed by theater veteran KA Nandajan in which Prakash played the role of Vladimir. 4Play, based on the works of Anton Chekhov and Jayaprakash Kulur was staged in 2012 with a cast of Prakash, Padmapriya, Manojkumar Narayanan, VKP, Ann Augustine, and Vandana Prabhu.

In 2017, BlueOcean collaborated with NECAB and Performance Studies Collective, Delhi to produce The Cabinet of Dr. Caligari - play directed by Deepan Sivaraman based on the classic German expressionist silent film of 1920. Prakash enacts in this play the title role of Dr Caligari.

Filmography (Actor)

Filmography (Producer)

References

External links 

 

Indian male film actors
21st-century Indian male actors
Living people
Male actors from Kerala
Male actors in Malayalam cinema
Male actors in Malayalam theatre
Malayalam film producers
People from Kasaragod district
Film producers from Kerala
Male actors in Marathi cinema
Year of birth missing (living people)